The john conti Coffee Company is a roaster and supplier of high-grown Arabican coffees. The company was founded in 1962 and is based in Louisville, Kentucky, where its roasting facility also resides. Since 1990, it has used the trademark "The Best Coffee in Town". Beyond coffee, the company also makes Contea brand iced tea and Aqua Conti bottled water.

History 
John Conti started the company in 1962 in Louisville, Kentucky as the john conti Vending Co. The company began installing coffee units at offices in 1971 and opened a coffee store in 1976. With the coffee business expanding, the vending business was sold in 1982.

In 1977, the Louisville Today Magazine named it "The Best Coffee in Town". In 1990—after winning that distinction in all following contents—the company applied for and received that tagline as a trademark.

A coffee museum that offered free coffee was built next to the Louisville factory, and operated until 2011. The brand expanded its market, being sold at Wal-mart and offered in single-serve brewing pods. It made a number of acquisitions to expand its presence.

John Conti retired in 2014, with Canteen of Kentuckiana subsequently running the business.

Products 
john Conti makes small batches of artisanal coffee. It has been noted for using the best Arabican coffee beans. Beyond coffee, the company also makes Contea brand iced tea and Aqua Conti bottled water.

References 

Manufacturing companies based in Louisville, Kentucky
Coffee companies of the United States
1962 establishments in Kentucky
American companies established in 1962